Liad Elmaliach (born 21 February 1989) is an Israeli footballer who plays for Hapoel Karmiel.

Career
Elmaliach is a homegrown player of Maccabi Haifa, where captained the young team. In 2009/10, he was promoted to the senior team.

He was loaned to Hapoel Acre in 2009/10. He made his debut against his home team, Maccabi Haifa and even scored a goal, but couldn't prevent a 1-2 defeat. He continued playing for Hapoel in 2010/11. He played 51 games at Hapoel Acre and scored 3 goals.

On 3 January 2011, Elmaliach signed a professional contract with the Polish football team Podbeskidzie Bielsko-Biała; he left the club on 4 July 2012.

References

1989 births
Living people
Israeli footballers
Maccabi Haifa F.C. players
Hapoel Acre F.C. players
Podbeskidzie Bielsko-Biała players
Hapoel Nof HaGalil F.C. players
Hapoel Ashkelon F.C. players
Hapoel Ra'anana A.F.C. players
Hapoel Karmiel F.C. players
Israeli Premier League players
Ekstraklasa players
Liga Leumit players
Israeli expatriate footballers
Expatriate footballers in Poland
Israeli expatriate sportspeople in Poland
Footballers from Karmiel
Association football midfielders